Ode to Sentience is the third studio album by Emily Jane White. It was released on November 8, 2010 by Talitres Records in France, on October 23, 2011 by JABUP Records in Japan, and on June 12, 2012 by Antenna Farm Records in United States.

Reception

Metacritic cited a score of 65 out of 100, generally favorable reviews based on 5 reviews.

Track listing

Personnel
 Emily Jane White – producing, mixing, vocals, guitar, piano, organ
 Henry Nagle – guitars
 James Finch Jr – bass
 Ross Harris – drums, engineering, mixing, producing
 Jen Grady – cello, vocals
 Carey Lamprecht – violin
 Stephen Jarvis – audio consultan
 John Greenham – engineering, mastering

Charts

Release history

References

External links
 Ode to Sentience Lyrics at Official Emily Jane White website

2010 albums
Emily Jane White albums